Colgate is both a surname and a given name. Notable people with the name include:

Surname 
Gilbert Colgate (1899–1965), American bobsledder
Pat Colgate, artistic director of the dance company Placer Theatre Ballet
Stirling Colgate (1925–2013), American physicist
William Colgate (1783–1857), American manufacturer, founder of what would become the Colgate Toothpaste Company
James Boorman Colgate (1818–1904), American financier
Samuel Colgate (1822–1897), American manufacturer and philanthropist
Samuel Colgate Jr. (1868–1902), American football coach
Steve Colgate (born 1935), American sailor

Given name 
Colgate Darden (1897–1981), American politician
Colgate Hoyt (1849–1922), American businessman

English-language surnames
Surnames of English origin
English toponymic surnames